Rudolf Marszałek SChr (August 29, 1911 - March 10, 1948) was a Polish priest of the Roman Catholic Church and a member of the Society of Christ. He served a chaplain during World War II, serving in the Home Army and National Armed Forces. As a member of the military arm of the Polish Underground State, he was arrested in December 1946 by the Ministry of Public Security. After spending a year in Mokotów Prison, he was sentenced to death on January 17, 1948, and executed on March 10, 1948.

References 

1911 births
1948 deaths
People from Bielsko-Biała
20th-century Polish Roman Catholic priests
Home Army officers